The Florida Keys Overseas Heritage Trail is a  paved rail trail—a multi-use bicycle and pedestrian facility—being constructed between Key Largo and Key West in the Florida Keys. ,  of the trail has been constructed.

History and route 
Using dedicated right of way separate from (but parallel to) U.S. Highway 1, the trail follows the former railbed of the Overseas Railroad, an extension of the Florida East Coast Railway that operated from 1911 until the 1935 Labor Day hurricane ended service. It comprises the southernmost portion of the East Coast Greenway, a  route of bicycle and pedestrian trails between Maine and Florida.

Plans for the trail include educational kiosks, roadside picnic areas, scenic overlooks, fishing piers, water access points, and bicycle and jogging paths. Historic railroad bridges along the trail—23 of which are still mostly intact—will be preserved. Original bridgework will be repaired or rebuilt, and spans removed during the 1980s and 1990s fishing pier conversion will be restored. Where the original bridges no longer exist, the trail will be temporarily cantilevered on the side of the newer US 1 bridges until new  bridge sections can be constructed. The design of the new bridges will match the historical character of the original bridges.

The Florida Keys Overseas Heritage Trail was designated a National Recreation Trail in 2004.

References

External links 
Florida Keys Overseas Heritage Trail  - Florida State Parks 
Florida Keys Overseas Heritage Trail at 100 Florida Trails

Florida Keys
Transportation in Monroe County, Florida
Rail trails in Florida
Long-distance trails in the United States
Bike paths in Florida
National Recreation Trails in Florida
Heritage trails